Kłanino Palace - a palace located in the village of Kłanino, Gmina Krokowa, Puck County, Pomeranian Voivodeship; in Poland. Currently, the palace is used as a hotel and restaurant.

References

External links 

Palaces in Poland
17th-century architecture